Jigs is a dansband, established in 1966 in Trollhättan, Sweden. The band scored several 1970s hits, with recordings of songs like Hallå du gamle indian, Bli min gäst, Dardanella, Let's Twist Again and From a Jack to a King. Their album series was named "Goa bitar". When the band played at Cortina in Vinberg on 16 July 1976, AC/DC appeared as a pause act.

Discography
Goa bitar 1* (1973)
Goa bitar 2* (1973)
Goa bitar 3* (1974)''Goa bitar 4* (1974)Goa bitar 5* (1974)
10 i toppar 1* (1975)Goa bitar 6* (1976)10 i toppar 2* (1976)Goa bitar 7* (1978)Greatest hits* (1979/1980)
Shirley* (1982)
Egna drömmar* (1983)
Blå hav* (1985)Goa bitar 11* (1989)''
Jigs 20 goabitar* (1997)
Jigs samlade goabitar* (2003)

References

External links
Official website

1966 establishments in Sweden
Dansbands
Musical groups established in 1966